Gian Vittorio Baldi (30 October 1930 - 23 March 2015) was an Italian film producer, director and screenwriter.

Life and career 
Born in Bologna, Emilia-Romagna, Baldi graduated in Social science at the Sapienza University  in Rome and then enrolled at the Centro Sperimentale di Cinematografia. He debuted as a director of documentary shorts, and in 1958 he won the Golden Lion for best short film at the Venice Film Festival with Il pianto delle zitelle ("The crying of spinsters"). He directed a number of independent films, generally characterized by  social criticism. His film Fuoco! entered the main competition at the 29th Venice International Film Festival, while the film L'ultimo giorno di scuola prima delle vacanze di Natale (aka The Last Day of School Before Christmas) was screened at the 1975 Cannes Film Festival in the Directors' Fortnight section.

Baldi also worked as a producer of art films, producing films by Pier Paolo Pasolini, Robert Bresson, Nelo Risi, Straub-Huillet and Dacia Maraini, among others. A devotee of natural wines, from the 1990s Baldi was active as a winemaker and produced several award-winning wines, notably the Ronchi di Castelluccio.

References

Further reading

External links 
 

1930 births
2015 deaths
20th-century Italian people
Italian film directors
Italian screenwriters
People from the Province of Ravenna
Sapienza University of Rome alumni
Centro Sperimentale di Cinematografia alumni
Italian film producers
Italian winemakers
Italian male screenwriters